Franklin Mithika Linturi is a Kenyan politician currently serving as the Cabinet Secretary for Agriculture. He previously served as the senator for Meru County in the Senate of Kenya elected in 2017 Kenyan General election on a Jubilee Party ticket. He previously served as Member of Parliament on a Kenya African National Union ticket elected to represent the Igembe South Constituency in the National Assembly of Kenya since the 2007 Kenyan parliamentary election a position he retained until 2017 when he became a senator. He was married to Marianne J. Kitany but by 2019, they had divorced.

References

Living people
Kenya African National Union politicians
Members of the National Assembly (Kenya)
1969 births
Meru people